Ron Hansell (3 October 1930 – 8 February 2013) was a footballer who played as an inside forward in the Football League for Norwich City and Chester.

References

1930 births
2013 deaths
English footballers
Chester City F.C. players
Norwich City F.C. players
Footballers from Norwich
Association football inside forwards
English Football League players
Great Yarmouth Town F.C. players
People from Caister-on-Sea